Corde lisse is an aerial circus skill or act that involves acrobatics on a vertically hanging rope. The name is French for "smooth rope".  In English-speaking parts of the world, it is also referred to as "aerial rope".

Description 

Corde lisse moves are normally a combination of held postures and drops using a rope that hangs from the ceiling. These ropes are normally made from soft cotton about 30-35mm thick. The technique is closely related to both silks, (another aerial circus skill performed on one or two long strips of strong fabric, often in bright colours), and Spanish web. It requires great skill and strength. Performers do not have any kind of safety net or safety line, relying on their own strength and ability to prevent a fall.

It is possible for two (or more) people to perform on the same rope, although more than two is rare. The performers can hang off each other or be at different heights on the rope.

The most famous use of aerial circus skills such as these has been for the BBC's test-card. 
Cirque du Soleil also uses corde lisse, aerial silks and trapeze in some of their shows.
There are many schools and circus centers that teach rope throughout the world.

Corde lisse skills 

There is no single naming convention for the skills on a corde lisse. Below is a list of names of moves, some of which are similar to the gymnastic equivalent, or which are a partial description of the move (e.g. double foot tie). This is by no means a complete list, as people are discovering and inventing new moves all the time.

Some solo moves
 Back Balance
 Front Balance
 Arabesque
 Basic upside-down hang
 Basqules
 Beats
 Big knot 
 Crochet
 Crucifixion
 Dive
 Double foot tie
 Fan
 Flag
 Front flip
 Hang
 Hip key
 Hip wrap knot
 Horizontal flip
 Knee lock
 Knee lock slide
 Lean out
 Leg wraps (same and opposite side, left and right leg)
 Loop
 Miracle split
 One arm hang
 Piston
 Rope climb (up and down)
 Salto
 Skip drop
 Spider
 Tempo swing
 Windmills
 C-Shape Roll-Ups

Some doubles moves

 Angel
 Ankle hang
 Double swan
 Flower
 Front balance
 Leg catch

References 
 Aerial Arts FAQ

Circus skills
Acrobatic_sports